Cernat is a Romanian surname. It originates from the Slavic root ćern-, meaning "black", along with the suffix -at. Černat(a) is a Slavic cognate.

The surname may refer to:
 Alexandru Cernat (1828–1893), Romanian general and politician
 Florin Cernat (born 1980), Romanian footballer
 Paul Cernat (born 1972), Romanian author

See also 
 Cernat (disambiguation)
 Cerna (surname)

References

Romanian-language surnames